Moses Nathanael Christopher Omobiala Scott  CBE (18 August 1911 – 9 May 1988) was an Anglican bishop, a Bishop of Sierra Leone who later became Archbishop of the Province of West Africa.

Born on 18 August 1911 and educated at a CMS Grammar School and Fourah Bay College in Sierra Leone he was ordained in 1946. He was a Curate at Lunsar then Priest in charge at Makeni. In 1950 he came to study at St John's College, Nottingham and after that was  a Curate at Grappenhall, Cheshire from 1951 to 1953 and then the incumbent at Bo in his home country. Later he was Archdeacon of Bonthe before appointment to the episcopate. In 1969 he became the province's primate, retiring in 1981.

During the 1978 Lambeth Conference, on 1 August, Scott preached at a service of Festal Evensong in Westminster Abbey in London.

He died on 9 May 1988.

References

 

1911 births
People educated at Christ's Hospital
Sierra Leone Creole people
Anglican bishops of Sierra Leone
20th-century Anglican bishops in Sierra Leone
20th-century Anglican archbishops
Commanders of the Order of the British Empire
Holders of a Lambeth degree
1988 deaths
Alumni of the London College of Divinity
Anglican archbishops of West Africa